This article includes a list of Argentine provinces by gross regional product (GRP), the value of all final goods and services produced within a nation in a given year, and other main indicators. The rows in this table can be sorted by clicking on the arrows at the top of any column.

Provinces

Notes
 a) Dollar values are nominal (not adjusted for purchasing power parity). Exchange rate of Argentine Peso to USD in 2017 was 16.563 Argentine Pesos per US dollar.
 b) Sectorial data from CEPAL (2000).
 c) Includes USD5.9 billion not specified by province.
 d) Excludes 427,000 motor vehicles (3.9%) not specified by province. Included in national total.
 e) 2017 data; includes employees registered with Social Security Administration only.
 f) 2014 data; official figures lower due to understated CPI index.
 g) 2001 Census.

See also 
 List of Argentine provinces by Human Development Index

References 

GRP, ArgentiNA
Provinces, GRP
GRP
Provinces by GRP
Provinces
A
Argentina